Balswaroop Raahi is a Hindi poet and lyricist of India. He was born in Village Timarpur New Delhi on 4 May 1936. He is best known for his Geet and Ghazal. He has written many songs for Bollywood. He is a resident of Model Town, New Delhi. He worked as Head of the Hindi department at Delhi University.

Books
Mera roop tumhara darpan
Jo nitant meri hai
 Raag viraag (Hindi opera based on Chitralekha)
Suraj ka rath
Raahi ko samjhaye kaun
Dadi amma mujhe batao
Hum sab aage niklenge
Gaal bane gubbare

References

Living people
Hindi-language poets
1936 births
Indian male poets
Poets from Delhi